Alsophila spinulosa, also known as the flying spider-monkey tree fern, is a species of tree fern in the family Cyatheaceae.

Description
The trunk of this species can grow to a height of 5 m or more. The stipes are persistent, spiny and purplish towards the base, and covered in brown shiny scales. Fronds are 1–3 m long and three-limbed. The sori, producing the spores, are large and round. Like many tree ferns, it features a "skirt" of dead leaves that do not drop off the crown and form a barrier for parasitic climbing plants.

Distribution and habitat
A. spinulosa occurs in humus soils in shadowed forest locations, and is widely distributed across Asia including China, Nepal, India, Burma, Myanmar, and Japan.

Use by humans
The stems are rich in starch and edible. Stem chips also see use as fern chips as a substrate for the cultivation of orchids.

Genome 
In May 2022, the genome of A. spinulosa, was sequenced by Huang et al. and showed whole-genome duplication had occurred approximately 100 million years ago; since then, evidence of the sequencing suggests, the genome has remained stable. It was only the third time a fern's entire genome had been entirely mapped, and the first instance of a fern with a genome of this size being sequenced.

Gallery

References

External links 
 台灣植物資訊整合查詢系統: http://tai2.ntu.edu.tw/specimen/specimen.php?taiid=010111

spinulosa